The Withlacoochee River or Crooked River is a river in central Florida, in the United States. It originates in the Green Swamp, east of Polk City, flowing west, then north, then northwest and finally west again before emptying into the Gulf of Mexico near Yankeetown. It is believed to have been named after the Withlacoochee River in the northern part of the state, near the border with Georgia.

The property was purchased for $13.5 million in 2005 from the South Florida Council, which had used it as the McGregor Smith Scout Reservation.

The Withlacoochee River flows through Pasco and Hernando counties, and then forms part of the boundary between Hernando County and Sumter County and all of the boundary between Citrus County and Sumter County, between Citrus County and Marion County and between Citrus County and Levy County (including Lake Rousseau). The largest city close to the river is Dade City.

Etymology 
"Withlacoochee" probably stems from a Muskhogean dialect, which suggests that its application is comparatively recent. It is compounded of Creek we (water), thlako (big), and chee (little), or little big water. This word combination signifies little river in the Creek language, and as we-lako or wethlako may also refer to a lake, it may signify a river of lakes, or lake river. The Withlacoochee flows just to the eastward of Tsala Apopka Lake, and the St. Johns River which flows through a series of large and small lakes was called welaka by the Seminoles.  An alternate etymology holds that Withlacoochee is a Native American word meaning "crooked river", which accurately describes the river as it makes its 70-mile journey from the Green Swamp in northern Polk County to the Gulf of Mexico at Yankeetown.

List of crossings

See also
 South Atlantic-Gulf Water Resource Region

References

Further reading 
 Henderson, Rex. 1990. Withlacoochee River. in Marth, Del and Marty Marth, eds. The Rivers of Florida. Sarasota, Florida: Pineapple Press, Inc. .

External links 
 Withlacoochee South Paddling Trail and Withlacoochee North Paddling Trail from the Florida Department of Environmental Protection

Rivers of Florida
Bodies of water of Hernando County, Florida
Bodies of water of Sumter County, Florida
Bodies of water of Pasco County, Florida
Bodies of water of Citrus County, Florida
Rivers of Marion County, Florida
Bodies of water of Levy County, Florida